Benedik Mioč (born 6 October 1994) is a Croatian footballer who plays as a midfielder.

Club career
Mioč started his career with the youth team of Osijek and captained the juvenile team. To get first team opportunities, he was loaned out to second tier club Segesta in 2013 along with a host of other players. Among the appearances he made, he featured for the club in a 2–0 defeat against Zadar in Croatian Football Cup which saw the club eliminated from the cup.

In February 2014, Mioč was loaned out to Višnjevac which played in 3. HNL, the third tier of Croatian football. He was loaned out another time in January 2015, this time to Belišće.

Mioč made his league debut for the club on 1 March 2016 in a draw against Hajduk Split. Coming as a 71st minute substitute for Zoran Lesjak, he managed to beat Hajduk goalie Lovre Kalinic in the last attack of the match. His contract was extended to 2020 in January 2017. In June of the same year, he scored a goal in a 2–0 victory over Andorran club Santa Coloma in the UEFA Europa League.

On 29 August 2018, Mioč joined Hungarian club Puskás Akadémia on a year-long loan deal.

References

External links
 

1994 births
Living people
Sportspeople from Osijek
Association football midfielders
Croatian footballers
Croatia youth international footballers
NK Osijek players
HNK Segesta players
NK Belišće players
Puskás Akadémia FC players
FC Sheriff Tiraspol players
NK Hrvatski Dragovoljac players
FC Saburtalo Tbilisi players
NK Slaven Belupo players
Croatian Football League players
First Football League (Croatia) players
Nemzeti Bajnokság I players
Moldovan Super Liga players
Erovnuli Liga players
Croatian expatriate footballers
Expatriate footballers in Hungary
Croatian expatriate sportspeople in Hungary
Expatriate footballers in Moldova
Croatian expatriate sportspeople in Moldova
Expatriate footballers in Georgia (country)
Croatian expatriate sportspeople in Georgia (country)